Bill C-45 is the name of various legislation introduced into the House of Commons of Canada, including: 
 Jobs and Growth Act, an omnibus bill introduced in 2012 to the first session of the 41st Parliament
 Cannabis Act, introduced in 2017 to the only session of the 42nd Parliament

Canadian federal legislation